Edward Vivian Robertson (May 27, 1881April 15, 1963) was a Welsh-born American politician who served as a member of the United States Senate for Wyoming from 1943 to 1949.

Early life 
Born in Cardiff, Wales, he served in the Third Battalion of the Welsh Regiment during the Second Boer War from 1899 to 1902. He then engaged in mechanical and electric power engineering from 1902 to 1912.

Career 
Robertson emigrated to the United States in 1912 and settled in Park County, Wyoming. He raised livestock and engaged in the mercantile business at Cody, Wyoming, from 1912 to 1942.

Robertson was elected as a Republican to the United States Senate in 1942 and served from January 3, 1943, to January 3, 1949. During his tenure, Robertson introduced legislation that would grant full citizenship to Native Americans. He was an unsuccessful candidate for re-election in 1948, and he retired from political and public life.

Personal life 
Robertson was a resident of Cody until 1958 when he moved to Pendleton, Oregon, where he died in 1963. He was interred in Mount Hope Cemetery in Baker, Oregon.

See also
 List of United States senators born outside the United States

External links

References 

1881 births
1963 deaths
British Army personnel of the Second Boer War
Military personnel from Cardiff
People from Cody, Wyoming
Wyoming Republicans
Welsh emigrants to the United States
Politicians from Baker City, Oregon
Burials in Oregon
Republican Party United States senators from Wyoming
20th-century American politicians
Welch Regiment soldiers